Chhupa Rustam is a 1973 Hindi film produced and directed by Vijay Anand. The film stars Dev Anand, Hema Malini, Vijay Anand, Bindu, Premnath, Prem Chopra, Ajit in pivotal roles. The music is by S. D. Burman.

Plot
The Government of India granted Rs.50,000/- to Professor Harbanslal (A. K. Hangal) to conduct a study in the mountains bordering Tibet with India, called the Nangla Project. Harbanslal is sure that within these ice-capped mountains lies an entire temple made of pure gold. When Vikram Singh (Ajit) and his son, Bahadur (Prem Chopra), find out about the Nangla Project, they abduct Harbanslal in order to force him to reveal the exact location of this temple, in vain though and end up killing him. Having failed in this venture, they kidnap the wife and son of multi-millionaire Rajendra Jain (Sajjan) and demand that he get Bahadur married to his daughter, Ritu (Hema Malini). Rajendra discusses this matter with Ritu, and Ritu is ready and willing to do anything for her mother and brother. Rajendra hesitates, and soon he receives his wife's thumb in the mail. Losing no time, Rajendra and Ritu make arrangements for the marriage and communicate accordingly with the kidnappers. Soon a wedding date is fixed, however, things do not go as planned as Ritu is abducted by a man called Natwarlal (Dev Anand) and taken to his hideout. While driving there, their car breaks down and they are forced to take a lift from Jimmy Fernandes (Vijay Anand), albeit at gunpoint. Jimmy drops them off at an isolated spot, leaving Natwarlal to work out the details of getting the ransom money from Rajendra. Before that could happen, Jimmy shows up and abducts Ritu. With his wife and son still held captive with Vikram and his son, Rajendra is at his wits' end as to whose life he should give priority to. Watch as events unfold to show what exactly was the motive in Ritu's multiple abductions, who is benefit by these incidents, and its connection with the Nangla Project.

Cast
 Dev Anand as Ashwini Kumar / Natwarlal / Chhupa Rustam
 Hema Malini as Ritu Jain
 Vijay Anand as Jimmy Fernandes
 Bindu as Vikram's Assistant
 Premnath as Williams
 Prem Chopra as Bahadur Singh
 Ajit as Vikram Singh
 Sajjan as Rajendra Jain
 Veena as Mrs. Rajendra Jain
 A. K. Hangal as Professor Harbanslal
 Sudhir as Lawrence

Crew
 Director - Vijay Anand
 Writer - Vijay Anand, Kaushal Bharati, Suraj Sanim
 Editor - Vijay Anand, Babu Sheikh (associate), Ashok Bandekar (assistant), Achyut Gupte (color)
 Producer - Vijay Anand
 Cinematographer - V. Ratra
 Art Director - T. K. Desai
 Assistant Director - Premnath Junior, Prem Prakash, Somnath Rangroo
 Assistant Art Director - Shankar Chougle, Bhaskar Deokar
 Makeup - Vasant Desai, Hariram Sharma
 Music Director - S. D. Burman
 Associate Composer - Meera Dev Burman
 Lyricists - Gopaldas Neeraj, Vijay Anand
 Playback Singers - Asha Bhosle, Kishore Kumar, Lata Mangeshkar, Manna Dey

Music
 The song "Dheere Se Jana Khatiyan Mein" was listed at #9 on Binaca Geetmala annual list 1973.

External links 
 
 Chhupa Rustam songs on Raaga.com

1973 films
1970s Hindi-language films
Films directed by Vijay Anand
Films scored by S. D. Burman